The HTC Butterfly 2 is a high-end Android smartphone released by HTC in 2014.

The phone received positive reviews. Kevin Nether of Android Authority described the phone as "basically the One (M8) in a plastic body", noting its dust and water resistance as advantages, but also that it lacked the premium build quality on the One (M8). Aloysius Low of CNET described the Butterfly 2 as "one of [HTC]'s best smartphones".

References

Butterfly 2
Android (operating system) devices
Mobile phones introduced in 2014
Mobile phones with infrared transmitter